Gotfred Svend Kristian Johansen (4 May 1895 – 2 February 1978) was a Danish lightweight professional boxer who competed in the 1920s. He was born in Copenhagen and died in Egebæksvang, Helsingør Municipality. He was the father of Eigil Johansen. Johansen won a silver medal in lightweight boxing at the 1920 Summer Olympics, losing to Samuel Mosberg in the final.

1920 Olympic results
Below is the record of Gotfred Johansen, a Danish lightweight boxer who competed at the 1920 Antwerp Olympics:

 Round of 16: defeated Jean Nays (Belgium)
 Quarterfinal: defeated Frank Cassidy (United States)
 Semifinal: defeated Clarence Newton (Canada)
 Final: lost to Samuel Mosberg (United States); was awarded silver medal

References

External links

1895 births
1978 deaths
Lightweight boxers
Olympic boxers of Denmark
Boxers at the 1920 Summer Olympics
Olympic silver medalists for Denmark
Place of birth missing
Olympic medalists in boxing
Danish male boxers
Medalists at the 1920 Summer Olympics
Sportspeople from Copenhagen